"Lovers Walk" is episode eight of season three of the television show Buffy the Vampire Slayer. It was written by Dan Vebber, directed by David Semel, and first broadcast on November 24, 1998.

Plot 
Buffy's unexpectedly high SAT score makes her start to think about the college opportunities open to her. That night, Spike returns to Sunnydale.

At school the next day, Giles prepares to leave for a Watchers' retreat and wants Buffy go to an out of state college if she wants.  Besides they have Faith to fill in for her while she was away at college. He warns Buffy about seeing Angel and she promises that nothing will happen between them. Xander tells Willow that he wishes that they could just get rid of their mutual attraction.

Willow goes to a local magic shop looking for ingredients to an anti-love spell. Spike, who is hiding at the back of the shop, decides that a spell to make Drusilla love him again would be a good idea. He kills the shopkeeper.

At school Willow works on her anti-love spell while arguing with Xander. Spike knocks Xander unconscious, before taking them both back to the factory to help with his love spell. When Willow tells Spike that she does not have enough ingredients, he goes to collect what she needs.

At the library, Buffy is working out when her mom calls to discuss her college plans. Buffy hears Spike's voice in the background and immediately runs home, thinking her mom is in danger. Angel sees Joyce and Spike talking in the kitchen and attempts to attack Spike, but cannot enter the house because he is not invited. Joyce, thinking Angel is still evil, backs away while Angel begs her to invite him in. Buffy arrives, pins Spike to the table and invites Angel in. Spike tells them he has got her friends and the three of them leave to get the supplies that Willow needs.

As Oz and Cordelia are driving to find Giles, Oz's werewolf enhanced sense of smell catches Willow's scent and can tell that she is afraid. Willow and Xander, believing themselves about to die, kiss just as Oz and Cordelia arrive to rescue them. Cordelia is horrified and runs up the stairs, but the stairs collapses and she is impaled on a piece of rebar.

As they leave with the supplies, Buffy, Angel and Spike are attacked by a welcoming committee of vampires sent by the mayor. Spike, exhilarated by the thrill of the fight, realizes that the way to get Drusilla back is not via a love spell, but to become the demon he once was, whom she loved.

Willow tells Buffy that Cordelia survived the fall, but is in the hospital, having lost a lot of blood. When Xander takes her flowers, Cordelia tells him to stay away from her. Buffy tells Angel that the only way they can continue to see each other is if he tells her that he does not love her, something he cannot do. A happy and confident Spike is seen driving out of Sunnydale on his way to find Drusilla.

Production details 
"Lovers Walk" was screenwriter Dan Vebber's first script for the show. The title of the episode has been cited as "Lovers Walk", "Lover's Walk" and "Lovers' Walk", but according to Rhonda Wilcox, "the script apparently does not carry an apostrophe ... making for a short, sad, declarative sentence for a title".

Music 
The characters Spike and Drusilla were inspired by the Sex Pistols bass guitarist Sid Vicious, and his girlfriend Nancy Spungen. "Lovers Walk" was nominated for an Emmy Award for Outstanding Sound Editing in a Series.

References

External links 

 

Buffy the Vampire Slayer (season 3) episodes
1998 American television episodes
Television episodes about abduction
Television episodes about infidelity